Melbourne Province was an electorate of the Victorian Legislative Council (Australia).

Melbourne Province was created in 1882 when Central Province was abolished in the redistribution of Provinces. Its area included central Melbourne, Carlton, Fawkner Park and Richmond.

William Hearn and James Lorimer transferred from Central to Melbourne Province that year.

In 1904, another redistribution occurred and Melbourne East Province, Melbourne North Province, Melbourne South Province, Melbourne West Province were created. The number of members representing Melbourne Province were reduced from four to two that year.

Melbourne Province was abolished at the 2006 state election in the wake of the Bracks Labor government's reform of the Legislative Council.

Members for Melbourne Province
Three members initially, four from 1889, two from 1904.

Election results

References

Former electoral provinces of Victoria (Australia)
1882 establishments in Australia
2006 disestablishments in Australia
History of Melbourne